Uuno Turhapuro is a Finnish comedy character and antihero created by Spede Pasanen and played by Vesa-Matti Loiri. Originally appeared in Spede Show during 1971–1973, the character gained popularity through the Uuno Turhapuro films.

Dramatis personae
Uuno Daavid Goljat Turhapuro is a ragged man, characterised by his tattered string vest, sparse row of teeth and untidy face, perhaps depicting a Finnish stereotype of a loser. His wife Elisabeth Turhapuro (played by Marjatta Raita) is the daughter of rich industrialist Councillor Tuura (Tapio Hämäläinen). In the beginning of the first film, in the couple's wedding, Uuno is tidy and cleanly, but gets ragged and lazy immediately after marrying a rich woman. Uuno's main pastime is lying on the couch, overeating, and acquiring his father-in-law's money. His biggest virtue is his gift of gab that he uses in settling marital problems, cadging free hot dogs from the stand and seducing other women.

The conventional plot of the films is based on the tension between Uuno and his father-in-law: the mining executive Councillor Tuura, disgusted by his dirty son-in-law, faces constant misfortune on his career, when Uuno pops up in the wrong places. When Tuura, just appointed as defence minister, orders Uuno into the army (Uuno Turhapuro armeijan leivissä), he attains the rank of major in a couple of days. When Tuura takes part in the presidential election (Uuno Turhapuro – herra Helsingin herra), Uuno becomes President of Finland by accident. Uuno's regular helpers are his auto mechanic friends Härski-Hartikainen (Spede Pasanen) and Sörsselssön (Simo Salminen), who help Uuno mainly because he has promised them a small share of Tuura's possible heritage. The films also contain numerous cameo appearances by Finnish politicians and celebrities, often as themselves.

A total of twenty Uuno Turhapuro films were made between 1973–2004. Originally there were plans for only one film, but due to its success, the film got 19 sequels. The two latest Uuno films are directed, produced and written by Ere Kokkonen. The most popular Uuno film is Uuno Turhapuro armeijan leivissä (1984), seen by more than 700,000 people in the theatres – an impressive figure in a country of 4.9 million inhabitants. It remains Finland's most seen domestic film made since 1968.

Uuno Turhapuro films
 Uuno Turhapuro (1973)
 Professori Uuno D.G. Turhapuro (1975)
 Lottovoittaja UKK Turhapuro (1976)
 Häpy Endkö? Eli kuinka Uuno Turhapuro sai niin kauniin ja rikkaan vaimon (1977)
 Rautakauppias Uuno Turhapuro – presidentin vävy (1978)
 Uuno Turhapuron aviokriisi (1981)
 Uuno Turhapuro menettää muistinsa (1982)
 Uuno Turhapuron muisti palailee pätkittäin (1983)
 Uuno Turhapuro armeijan leivissä (1984)
 Uuno Epsanjassa (1985)
 Uuno Turhapuro muuttaa maalle (1986)
 Uuno Turhapuro – kaksoisagentti (1987)
 Tupla-Uuno (1988)
 Uunon huikeat poikamiesvuodet maaseudulla (1990)
 Uuno Turhapuro – herra Helsingin herra (1991)
 Uuno Turhapuro – Suomen tasavallan herra presidentti (1992)
 Uuno Turhapuron poika (1994)
 Johtaja Uuno Turhapuro – pisnismies (1998)
 Uuno Turhapuro – This Is My Life (2004) (A tribute film to Spede Pasanen, who died in 2001)

Other film appearances
 Koeputkiaikuinen ja Simon enkelit (1979)
 Tup-akka-lakko (1980)
 Vääpeli Körmy ja vetenalaiset vehkeet (1991)

TV series
 Uuno Turhapuro armeijan leivissä (1986) (The film as a seven-part, extended TV series)
 Uuno Turhapuro (television series) (1996)
 Johtaja Uuno Turhapuro – pisnismies (1999) (The film as a five-part, extended TV series)
 Uuno Turhapuro – This is my Life (2006) (The film as a five-part, extended TV series)

Unofficial films

 Uuno Turhapuron veli (1994)
Uuno Turhapuro is not seen in this film ("Uuno Turhapuro's Brother"). Spede was having a falling-out with Loiri, and so Loiri wouldn't act in it. Later Spede considered the film a mistake, and has commented it by saying "forget the whole film".

Other related products

 Uuno Turhapuro muuttaa maalle  (1986) (a game for the Commodore 64 home computer, based on the movie with the same name)

References

External links
Official homepage (in Finnish)

Finnish comedy
Comedy television characters
Comedy film characters
Male characters in television
Male characters in film
Television characters introduced in 1973
Film characters introduced in 1973
Fictional Finnish people
Spede Pasanen